Dragan Maksimović (7 February 1949 – 4 February 2001) was a Serbian actor.

Biography
Maksimović (nicknamed Maks) performed in more than sixty theatrical plays, movies and TV productions, between 1971 and 1999. His debut was in National Theatre in Belgrade playing Soldier in the play Mother Courage and her Children, 1971.

On 18 November 2000, Maksimović was attacked in the Zeleni Venac neighbourhood, in day-time, by a group of FK Rad supporters (after their team lost a match against FK Obilić), who assumed he was Romani. He died on 4 February 2001 in hospital. On the initiative by film director Goran Marković, a commemorative plaque was placed at Zeleni Venac on 18 November 2006. The perpetrators were never apprehended.

Selected filmography

References

External links
 

1949 births
2001 deaths
People from Podujevo
Kosovo Serbs
Serbian male film actors
People murdered in Serbia
Serbian murder victims
2001 murders in Serbia
Deaths by beating in Europe
Unsolved murders in Serbia
Antiziganism in Serbia